Amidabad-e Sofla (also Romanized as ʿAmīdābād-e Soflá; also known as Amīdābād-e Paeen) is a village in Darmian Rural District, in the Central District of Darmian County, South Khorasan Province, Iran. At the 2006 census, its population was 45, in 17 families.

References 

Populated places in Darmian County